Kelantan Football Club is a Malaysian professional football club based in Kota Bharu, Kelantan. The club plays in the Malaysia Super League, the top tier of Malaysian football since 2023.

Founded in 1946, the club have a long-standing rivalry with Terengganu, the two east coast clubs involved in what is known as the East Coast Derby. Their home is the 22,000-seat Sultan Muhammad IV Stadium. Kelantan's regular kit colours are red shirt and shorts with a white pattern on the side.

The club had their first major success in the 2012 season, when they have won treble which is Malaysia Super League championship, Malaysia FA Cup and Malaysia Cup. Domestically, the club have won the Malaysia Super League Championship on 2 occasions, most recently in the 2012 season, 2 Malaysia Cup titles, 2 Malaysia FA Cup titles, 1 Charity Shield and 1 Malaysia Premier League title. 2012 was their debut playing in the AFC Cup. They played well in the group stage to gain first place. However, the club lost in the quarter final to Erbil SC.

This club had obtained the FAM Club License to play in the 2018 Malaysia Super League season.

History

Kelantan Football Club was founded in 1946 as Kelantan Amateur Football Association. KAFA won the first cup in 1953 when they won the Malaysia FAM Cup and retained the cup for the next year. In 1963, KAFA played in the final Malaysia FAM Cup but lose to Singapore. By the period of the 70s, The club had be unlucky when they losing streak three cup final (Malaysia cup 1970, FAM cup 1971 and 1972). In 1972, Dali Omar became the first Kelantanese-born player who played abroad when he joined Australian sided, Perth Azurri which the English former player, Bobby Charlton had played.

The former chief minister of Kelantan state, Ahmad Rastom Ahmad Maher was appointed as the president in 1986. 5 years later, the former Kelantan State Secretary, Wan Hashim Wan Daud took over the post. He held the post until 2004 followed by Ahmad Jazlan Yaakub.

By 2005 Kelantan was the only state team that played in the third-tier football league in Malaysia. The team ended the season bottom of the second-tier Malaysia Premier League and was then relegated to the third-tier league of Malaysia, Malaysia FAM League.

Tan Sri Annuar Musa took over Kelantan in 2007 and many changes have occurred. Various new approach and renewal was done by him in management and team. The team succeed to improve position in Malaysia Premier League during 2007–08 season. The team ended in third place during the season. The club was Malaysia FA Cup and Malaysia Cup runners-up during 2009 season. Annuar brought a revolution and transformed the way the team was run by introducing changes that were akin to those practised overseas. Local players were given exposure and national players were signed into the team to have a good blend of experience and finesse. Sponsorship deals were signed with various companies and with a good cash flow going into the first few years of his leadership, Kelantan FA re-branded as The Red Warriors and was ready to take the pitch by storm.

2009 season

2009 was the Kelantan debut season in the Malaysia Super League after got promoted from Malaysia Premier League. They obtained 6th spot in the league with 44 points. During the Malaysia FA Cup final, they have lost to Selangor, 1–4 on penalties after both team ended 1–1 after extra time. Malaysia Cup became their second finals for the season but unfortunately they lost to Negeri Sembilan where the match was held at the National Stadium, Bukit Jalil.

2010 season

The team gained second place in the Malaysia Super League table behind Selangor with 59 points. The top scorer for the team was Norshahrul Idlan with 11 goals in the league and 14 goals overall. The team only lost once along the season while they playing against Kedah in Kota Bharu. Kelantan much awaited 89-years drought of Piala Malaysia ended in the 2010 Malaysia Cup after defeating defending champions Negeri Sembilan in the final at the Bukit Jalil National Stadium. They came from behind to clinch a 2–1 win. Negeri Sembilan opened the scoring in the 13th minute through a penalty kick by Shahurain Abu Samah after Kelantan's keeper Khairul Fahmi felled S. Kunalan in the penalty box. The equaliser came in the 57th minute from a header by Kelantan senior striker Hairuddin Omar through a pass by Norshahrul Idlan. Kelantan then took the lead through Badhri Radzi in the 65th minute from a lovely pass by Nor Farhan Muhammad. Kelantan victorious coach B. Sathianathan refused to commit his future to the newly crowned Malaysia Cup champions as he awaits the result of an appeal against a six-months ban. Unfortunately, the team campaign in 2009 Malaysia FA Cup ended in the second round when they ended draw but Kedah advanced to next round based on away goals rule.

2011 season

Kelantan started their 2011 season by beating Selangor 2–0 in the Charity Shield match held at the Shah Alam Stadium. The goals scored by Norshahrul Idlan through penalty kick after 7th minute match starts. In the 76th minute, Badhri Radzi securing a 2–0 win for the team. In the Malaysia FA Cup campaign, Kelantan lost to Terengganu 1–2 after extra time during final. The goal scored by Azwan Roya in the 79th minute. During the Malaysia Super League campaign, Kelantan won the title for Pthe first time. Therefore, they qualified to compete in the 2012 AFC Cup. Norshahrul Idlan became the top scorer for the team. He scored 19 goals in the league and 25 goals overall. Kelantan's Malaysia Cup campaign ended in the quarter-finals as they have lost to Terengganu with 5–3 on aggregate.

2012 season

In the 2012 season, the team clinched their second successive Malaysia Super League titles in style after thrashing Perak 6–0 at their home ground. Indra Putra made a hat-trick and 1 goal each from Mohammed Ghaddar, Badhri Radzi and Azwan Roya were enough for the defending champions to top the league again, regardless of the outcome in their two remaining matches. During the 2012 Malaysia Cup campaign, they qualified to the final playing against ATM at the Shah Alam Stadium. Before that, they won against Selangor in the semi-finals and Felda United in the quarter-finals. They were top of the table along with Terengganu, ATM and Kedah. In the final, Norshahrul Idlan scored the opening goal for the team a minute before half-time. Two minutes after the second half started, Rezal Zambery scored by a 20-meter shot defeating goalkeeper, Khairul Fahmi. A minute later, Norshahrul Idlan scored back to make 2–1. In the 63rd minute, Saint Vincent and the Grenadines national striker, Marlon Alex James scored with a header. The scores remained 2–2 until they added an extra time. In the 95th minute, Indra Putra scored with a wonderful volley from the right side defeating Farizal Harun. Kelantan beat ATM during 2012 Malaysia Cup final. The historical win completed a treble of wins for Kelantan after emerging Malaysia FA Cup champions and Malaysia Super League champions that season, a feat last achieved by Kedah for two consecutive seasons in 2007 and 2008.

2013 season

Kelantan started the season with a defeated to ATM on the Charity Shield match. They have lost on penalties after draw 1–1 after extra time scores by Indra Putra. The first league match was at their home ground and they won against PKNS with scores 2–1. Badhri Radzi scores the equaliser at the last minute of the match to Kelantan gained 3 points. They started the 2013 season with a bit inconsistent. They only got 1 win, 3 draws, and 1 lost in the first 5 matches in the league. Kelantan close their league campaign by beating LionsXII 2–0 at the Sultan Muhammad IV Stadium in Kota Bharu. Goals were scored by Badhri Radzi and Dickson Nwakaeme.

In the 2013 Malaysia FA Cup, the team met Johor Darul Ta'zim in the final after defeating Terengganu with 6–5 on aggregate in semi-finals. They also defeating east-Malaysia team, Sarawak in the quarter-finals with 4–1 on aggregate. The team initially gets a bye for the first round and they played at the second round defeating PKNS in Sultan Muhammad IV Stadium in Kota Bharu with 4–2 win. During the final, Kelantan wins 1–0 against Johor Darul Ta'zim. The sole goal was scored by Nor Farhan Muhammad 15 minutes into the game. With this victory Kelantan successfully retain their Malaysia FA Cup title for the second year in the row.

During Malaysia Cup final, Kelantan failed to retain their title last year after a defeat to Pahang with 0–1.

2014 season

Kelantan started the season with a win with a one-goal difference during the match against Sime Darby at their home ground, Sultan Muhammad IV Stadium 2 goals scored by Mohammed Ghaddar. Their first loss in this season was at their home ground against PKNS when an unexpected comeback with 2 goals after an opening goal from Fakri Saarani at 30th minute of the match. During this season Kelantan only win 10 from 24 matches and at the last the chart shows that Kelantan finish 6th from all 12 teams that compete in Malaysia Super League. Controversy arose when the fans were not happy with head coach, Steve Darby because of his style of management and he was replaced by former English club player, George Boateng after a big lost 0–4 to Sime Darby. Ghanaian forward Prince Tagoe signed with Kelantan after departure of Mohammed Ghaddar during mid season. He only made 3 appearances before being released due to poor performance.

2015 season

Kelantan began the 2015 season with a 2–0 win over ATM during away match at Majlis Perbandaran Selayang Stadium, and their first loss came when they lose 0–4 to the newly promoted PDRM on 21 February. Their 2015 Malaysia Super League ended with the team get 9th places from 12 teams competing with 8 wins, 4 draws and 10 losses from all 22 matches played. Their best achievement this season came when they became 2015 Malaysia FA Cup runner-up behind the champions LionsXII after losing 1–3 to LionsXII with a consolation goal scored by Wan Zack Haikal in 63rd minute before 2 goal scored by LionsXII supersub, Sahil Suhaimi in 82nd and 92nd minute lifted up LionsXII to become 2015 Malaysia FA Cup champion. Their 2015 Malaysia Cup ended with the team did not advance to knockout phase after lasted in 3rd place in group C, 1 point behind second place Felda United and 2-point behind the top table team, Selangor. Kelantan had 2 changes of head coaches this season with George Boateng replaced by Azraai Khor on 24 March and the second changes came on 4 July after Azraai Khor resigned and replaced by Zahasmi Ismail who became the caretaker head coach for the rest of the season. Wan Zaharulnizam also became the first player to win PFAM Player of the Month. Brazilian Gilmar became their top scorer this season for all competition with 11 goals.

2016 season

The team started the season with a 0–0 draw with Perak at the away team home ground, Perak Stadium and their first win and loss came when they won 1–0 over PDRM and lost 1–2 to Kedah. Their 2016 Malaysia Super League campaign ended at 4th places from 12 teams competing with 7 wins, 8 draws and 7 losses from all 22 matches played with 29 points collected. Their 2016 Malaysia FA Cup journey ended at Round of 16 after losing 4–5 on penalty shoot-out to Kedah after a 1–1 draw with a goal scored by Jonathan McKain. The Malaysia Cup campaign ended with the team did advanced to knockout phase after lasted in second place in group B, 1 point behind the top table Selangor. They were knocked out by PDRM in the quarter-finals by away goals rule after a 2–2 draw on aggregate. Kelantan had changes of head coaches this season with K. Devan resigned from his position on 12 May and being replaced by former Maldives national team head coach, Velizar Popov on 13 May. Baze Ilijoski became top scorer of the team with 16 goals. This season also saw a change in the club president after Tan Sri Annuar Musa has decided to quit the post with immediate effect on 8 November with the position temporarily held by vice president, Afandi Hamzah.

2017 season

On 30 November 2016, Zahasmi Ismail was appointed as the team new head coach, succeeding Velizar Popov in the role facing the 2017 season. Kelantan almost got relegated to the second-tier league but came strong during last match clinched a 1–3 win over Melaka United and finished at 10th of the table.

On 17 December 2017, Bibi Ramjani Ilias Khan was voted in as the new president of Kelantan Football Association for the term 2018–2021. She was appointed to the top post of the association after defeating Datuk Muhammad Nasir Hamzah in the voting process. Bibi told FOX Sports Asia regarding the 2018 Malaysia Super League that "Both Apek (Khairul Fahmi) and Piya (Badhri) are not in the coach's plans, so we will release them if there are offers. Previously I have changed coaches to please the senior players, but now I have to respect the coach." Datuk Seri Afandi Hamzah defended his deputy president post, overcoming Datuk Rosmadi Ismail in the process.

2020 season

On 6 September 2020, the club was being purchased by businessman Norizam Tukiman for RM 6.8 million. The reason him purchase the club to save the club from bankruptcy with former player debts that too high.

2021 season

For 2021, as part of the effort to revamp the club and to bring the club back to its glory days, Norizam Tukiman reshuffle the whole structure of the club from the coaching staff until the players.

Almost 90% of the players for 2021 season are new players and the native of Kelantan. The club successfully appointed a new line up of coaching staffs, led by Marco Ragini, to instill Italian DNA. After that, the coach resign after some health issue in the same season.

Apart from the restructuring the club's line up, the management also had taken effort to slowly acquire assets for the club such as TRW Hotel & a 4 wheel-drive.

On 3 May 2021, Kelantan's owner, Norizam Tukiman expanded his empire by purchasing an Indonesian club, PSPS Riau which currently competes in Liga 2. The acquisition opens up opportunities for both clubs to establish a long-term cooperation for the mutual benefits.

2022 season 

During 2022 Malaysia Premier League, Kelantan finished second place only behind Johor Darul Ta'zim II  and promoted back into top flight Malaysian football after absent 5 years in the second tier competition. The club receive and obtain national license from MFL and First Instance Body (FIB) and will feature in next season Super League.

2023 season 

For the 2023 season, Kelantan appointed former South Korea national player that feature on 2002 FIFA World Cup, Choi Moon-Sik as the club's new head coach. They also participate in 2023 ASEAN Charity Shield against Buriram United. Eventually, Kelantan got trashed by Buriram 7–0.

AFC Cup competitions

2012 season

2012 was Kelantan debut compete in AFC Cup, they are eligible to compete in the competition after winning the 2011 Malaysia Super League title. Terengganu as 2011 Malaysia FA Cup winner also will represent Malaysia in the 2012 AFC Cup. Kelantan was drawn into Group G with Arema Cronous, Ayeyawady United and Navibank Sài Gòn. The team was on top of the table with 13 points in 6 matches. Malaysian's partner, Terengganu was defeated by Kelantan in the round of 16 by 3–2 in Kota Bharu. During quarter-finals, Kelantan lost to Erbil SC from Iraq 6–2 on aggregate. Mohammed Ghaddar was the team top scorer with 8 goals.

2013 season

2013 was Kelantan second year playing in AFC Cup after winning a treble in the Malaysian football in the 2012 season. Kelantan start their 2013 AFC Cup campaign on 6 March 2013 with 1–1 draw against Maziya during group stage. Their goal was scored by Badhri Radzi at 77th minute of the match. Kelantan has gained first place in the group stage, group G with SHB Đà Nẵng, Maziya and Ayeyawady United. They qualified just until round of 16 after defeated by Hong Kong's football club, Kitchee SC with 2–0 in score. Selangor also participate in the AFC Cup competitions. Badhri Radzi and Dimitri Petratos was the top scorer for the team with 4 goals.

2014 season

In 2014, Kelantan has been eligible to play for the third consecutive year in the AFC Cup after beating Johor Darul Ta'zim 1–0 during the 2013 Malaysia FA Cup final. Kelantan have been drawn into group G along with South China, Yangon United and Vissai Ninh Bình. They finished bottom of the group with only 3 points in 6 group stage matches. On 26 February, the team started their AFC campaign with a 5–3 loss to Burmese club, Yangon United. Wan Zaharulnizam scored 1 goal and 2 more goals came from captain, Badhri Radzi. Wan Zaharulnizam became the top scorer of the team during 2014 campaign with 3 goals.

Stadium

Sultan Muhammad IV Stadium is the oldest football field in Malaysia and probably the oldest in Asia continent based on the use of field. The stadium was built in 1967 and initially aims to provide a venue for sports activities from Kelantan, especially as a football pitch. The stadium was built in an area of 13 acres at a cost of RM 1.5 million, was built in stages.

It was built on the site of a football field of Kelantan Football Association and located in the heart of Kota Bharu town center. The stadium initially managed by the Association of Kelantan Stadium, which is chaired by the Menteri Besar of the state of Kelantan and comprises a total of 30 members made up of government employees as well as representatives of sports associations.

The stadium is usually full by 30,000 spectators especially during the Malaysia FA Cup and the Malaysia Cup matches.

Controversy

2009 FA Cup semi-final incident
On 7 April 2009, Halim Napi was suspended for punching and stepping on Negeri Sembilan's defender, Aidil Zafuan during 2009 Malaysia FA Cup semi-final first-leg match. As a result of the incident, the team have been slapped with a total fine of RM 900,000 and their ground in Kota Bharu has been suspended as a venue for all matches sanctioned by Football Association of Malaysia until the end of the season.

2013 Lack of ticket issue
On 25 June 2013, Kelantan fans turned unruly after the 2013 Malaysia FA Cup final tickets were sold out in 10 minutes after counter opened. There were chaotic scenes when the tickets were put up on sale at the Sultan Muhammad IV Stadium. The fans, who had started queuing up for the tickets from as early as 6 a.m., became agitated when the tickets were sold out barely 10 minutes after going on sale at 9 a.m. Although Kelantan Football Association was allocated 30,000 of the 87,000 tickets available for the finals against Johor Darul Ta'zim, fans claimed that only 16 tickets were bought by four spectators before the sold-out announcement was made. This caused the agitated fans to break down the stadium gate before forcing the seller to hand over the bag containing the tickets.

However, there were only tickets for the previous night's Malaysia Super League match between Kelantan and Pahang in the bag. The angry fans then proceeded to tear up the tickets before venting their anger by hurling abuse at absent Kelantan FA officials. Kelantan FA's secretary and team manager, Azman Ibrahim, said that most of the 30,000 tickets had been pre-booked in bulk, and there were limited tickets on sale at the stadium. He also assured the fans that the pre-booked tickets were for Kelantan FA supporters. He has requested the Football Association of Malaysia for more tickets, and said that he expected a response on 26 June. The problem of insufficient tickets is not new, as many fans always want to see Kelantan FA play whenever it is in a final.

2016 financial constraint issue
In 2016, the club has been going through critical financial problem of settling its outstanding players and coach salaries. It also having problem getting new sponsorship for the team. Kafa president Annuar Musa's decision to quit during this time of trouble and the team is going through bad performances was questioned by many who had likened him to "a captain abandons his sinking ship".

Season by season records

P = Played
W = Games won
D = Games drawn
L = Games lost
F = Goals for
A = Goals against
Pts = Points
Pos = Final position
N/A = No answer

MSL = Malaysia Super League
MPL = Malaysia Premier League
PL1 = Premier League 1
PL2 = Premier League 2
PL = Premier League

R1 = Round 1
R2 = Round 2
R3 = Round 3

R4 = Round 4
R5 = Round 5
R6 = Round 6
R16 = Round of 16
GR = Group Stage
QF = Quarter-finals
SF = Semi-finals
RU = Runners-up
S = Shared
W = Winners

Individual player awards

Golden Boot Winners

* Only players who won the golden boot listed

League Top Goalscorers

* Only goals scored during a league match counted

Club Top Goalscorers

* All goals scored by the player in any competitions counted

Honours

International competitions
AFC Cup: 3 appearances
 2012: Quarter-finals (lost 2–6 on aggregate to Arbil)
 2013: Round of 16 (lost 0–2 to Kitchee)
 2014: Group stage (4th position)

Domestic competitions

League
Division 1/ Malaysia Super League
 Winners (2): 2011, 2012
 Runners-up (1): 2010
Division 2/ Malaysia Premier League
 Winners (1): 2000
 Runners-up (2): 1990, 2022
Division 3/ Malaysia FAM League
 Winners (3): 1953*, 1954, 2005 (* shared)
 Runners-up (3): 1963, 1971, 1972

Cups
Malaysia Cup
 Winners (2): 2010, 2012
 Runners-up (4): 1955, 1970, 2009, 2013
Malaysia FA Cup
 Winners (2): 2012, 2013
 Runners-up (3): 2009, 2011, 2015
Charity Shield
 Winners (1): 2011
 Runners-up (2): 2012, 2013

Treble
 "Treble Winner" (Malaysia Super League, Malaysia FA Cup and Malaysia Cup): 1
 2012

U21 Team
President Cup
 Winners (7): 1985, 1995, 2005, 2011, 2013, 2015, 2016
 Runners-up (3): 1988, 2003, 2006–07

U19 Team
Youth Cup
 Winners (2): 2008, 2014
 Runners-up (1): 2013

Record of success

Players

First-team squad

Out on loan

Development squad

Women squad

Former players

Management

Coaching staff

Club personnel

Managerial history
Managers by years (1991–present)

Coaches
Coaches by years (1986–present)

Captain history
Captain by years (2016–present)

Halls of Fame

100 Appearances Players
100 Appearances Players (2008–present)
  Mohd Badhri Mohd Radzi
  Khairul Fahmi Che Mat
  Indra Putra Mahayuddin
  Nor Farhan Muhammad
  Farisham Ismail

* Senior club appearances counted for the domestic league only.

Sponsorship
The following are the sponsors of Kelantan Football Club:

Title and Shirt Sponsors

Alliance clubs
 Nara United
 Pattani
 Cardiff City
 Blackburn Rovers
 FC Bari 1908

See also

References

External links 
 Kelantan Football Club Official website

 
 
 

 
Malaysia Super League clubs
Malaysia Premier League clubs
Football clubs in Malaysia
Kelantan F.C.
Malaysia Cup winners
1946 establishments in British Malaya
Association football clubs established in 1946